The Greatest Hits is the second Greatest Hits compilation album released by Scottish pop rock quartet Wet Wet Wet. Released on 8 November 2004, it was the band's first release since disbanding seven years earlier. The album reached #13 in the UK Albums Chart, and spawned the single "All I Want", which peaked at #14 on the UK Singles Chart.

The album contains a selection of singles from across the band's ten-year career, as well as three previously unreleased tracks. A limited edition double-disc version of the album, containing further singles plus five previously unreleased live recordings, was also made available for a limited time from the day of release.

All I Want was one of five new songs recorded for the campaign; two further new recordings, "Hear Me Now" and "(Feels Like I'm) Walking on Water", appear on the album itself, and "Learn from Each Mistake" and "I Don't Wanna Fight Anymore" appear as B-sides on the All I Want single release.

Track listing

Charts

References

Wet Wet Wet albums
2004 greatest hits albums